Focus Features LLC is an American film production and distribution company, owned by Comcast as a division of Universal Pictures, which is itself a division of its wholly owned subsidiary NBCUniversal. Focus Features distributes independent and foreign films in the United States and internationally.

In November 2018, The Hollywood Reporter named Focus Features Distributor of the Year for its success behind the year's breakout documentary film Won't You Be My Neighbor? and Spike Lee's BlacKkKlansman. The studio's most successful film to date is Downton Abbey, which garnered $194.3 million at the worldwide box office.

History 
Focus Features was formed in 2002 by James Schamus and David Linde and formed from the divisional merger of USA Films, Universal Focus and Good Machine, as well as the several assets of the Vivendi-affiliated film studio StudioCanal. USA Films was created by Barry Diller in 1999 when he purchased October Films and Gramercy Pictures from Seagram and merged the two units together. Universal Focus is the specialty film arm of Universal Pictures that was created in 1999 as Universal Classics, which was led by Paul Hardart and Claudia Gray, to replace the October Films label in order to get a group of titles to be distributed by USA Films, focused on the marketing of niche-based acquisitions by Universal Pictures International, Working Title, WT2 Productions, Revolution Films and DNA Films, and eventually rebranded into Universal Focus by 2000.

In March 2004, Focus Features revived Rogue Pictures as a genre label, which was once used by October Films in the late 1990s. Rogue Pictures would be led by the same team who led the standard Focus management.

On October 2, 2013, James Schamus was fired from his position as CEO of Focus, with the New York offices being shut down in the process. He was succeeded by Peter Schlessel, whose company FilmDistrict would be merged into Focus and folded into the trade name High Top Releasing. This became effective in January 2014, and several titles developed under FilmDistrict would be released under Focus. Under Schlessel, the company began to acquire films with a wider commercial appeal, much like his previous company. In May 2015, Gramercy Pictures was revived by Focus as a genre label, that was on action, sci-fi, and horror films.

In February 2016, Focus merged with Universal Pictures International as part of a new strategy to "align the acquisition and production of specialty films in the global market". Following this, along with several disappointing box office returns, Schlessel was let go from the company and replaced with Peter Kujawski.

In April 2017, Vine Alternative Investments re-acquired the pre-2008 Rogue film library from Focus Features.

Focus World 
In August 2011, Focus Features launched Focus World, a label focusing on the video on demand market with initial plans to distribute 15 films per year, with one film being released per month.

Distributors

Australia 
 Roadshow Entertainment (2003–2009)
 Icon Film Distribution (2004–2012)
 Universal Pictures (2006–present)

United Kingdom 
 Momentum Pictures (now Entertainment One) (2006–2014)
 Entertainment Film Distributors (2002–2008)
 Universal Pictures (2006–present)

United States 
 Universal Pictures
 Sony Pictures Worldwide Acquisitions (FilmDistrict/Insidious films)

Canada 
 Alliance Films (2002–2013)
 Entertainment One (2013–2016)
 Universal Pictures (2016–present)

As a distributor, Focus' most successful release in North America to date is the 2019 film Downton Abbey, which earned $84.5 million during its first weekend at the box office and surpassing Brokeback Mountain, which earned $83 million at the North American box office. However, this is not counting the domestic total of Traffic, which earned $124.1 million under the USA Films banner. The animated film Coraline (which Focus did not produce, but did distribute) was also highly profitable for the company. Although suffering its share of unsuccessful releases, Focus has been consistently profitable, and its international sales arm (unusual among studio specialty film divisions) allows it to receive the foreign as well as domestic revenues from its releases. Its DVD and movie rights revenues are boosted by cult classics including Wet Hot American Summer.

Filmography

See also 
 Rogue
 FilmDistrict
 Sony Pictures
 Stage 6 Films

References

External links 
 

Comcast subsidiaries
Film distributors of the United States
Film distributors of Canada
Film production companies of the United States
2002 establishments in the United States
Mass media companies established in 2002
American independent film studios
International sales agents